In Timor-Leste, transportation is reduced due to the nation's poverty, poor transportation infrastructure, and sparse communications networks. The general condition of the roads is inadequate, and telephone and Internet capabilities are limited in the countryside. The country has six airports, one of which has commercial and international flights. There are no railroads in East Timor.

Railways
There are no railways in East Timor.

Roadways

Overview

The road network is made up of national roads linking municipal capitals (~), municipal roads linking municipal capitals to towns and villages (~), urban roads within urban areas (~) and rural roads within rural areas (~). In a 2015 survey reported by the World Bank, 57% of the rural roads were rated either bad or poor.

National roads
East Timor has 20 arterial roads, designated as A-class roads (national roads), as follows:

In October 2016, the East Timorese government symbolically launched a rehabilitation project for the Dili–Manatuto–Baucau national road. Construction was to be undertaken in two sections, Dili–Manatuto, and Manatuto–Baucau, in each case by a Chinese construction company. The project was financed by the General State Budget, and also from a loan fund from the Japanese government, through the Japan International Cooperation Agency (JICA). It was due to be completed in mid-2019, and the completed road was officially inaugurated on 26 August 2022.

According to a road network connectivity quality assessment published in September 2019, the national road network already satisfactorily connected all national activity centres for all
types of vehicles in circulation. However, some of the road segments needed to be improved, in terms of road width, drainage, geometric design and traffic facilities.

Bridges 

Bridges in Dili

Two road bridges over the Comoro River link central Dili with the west side of the city, including the Presidente Nicolau Lobato International Airport and the Tibar Bay port, which as at early 2022 was due to start operations later that year.

Noefefan Bridge

This bridge, also known as the Tono Bridge, was inaugurated in 2017 as part of the ZEESM TL project in Oecusse.

Ports and harbors

 Port of Dili – for passenger ships and cruise ships carrying international passengers
 Tibar Bay Port – for import and export goods; opened on 30 September 2022

Merchant marine
total
 1

ships by type
passenger/cargo 1 (2010)

Airports

, East Timor had eight airports. The three major ones were the Presidente Nicolau Lobato International Airport in Dili, the Cakung or Baucau Airport in Baucau, and the Suai Airport in Suai. Only the first two of these were designed as international airports.

The Presidente Nicolau Lobato International Airport in Dili is the main international airport. Commercial scheduled service is also provided at Suai Airport and Oecusse Airport. Local airports include Baucau Airport and Viqueque Airport.

No airport in East Timor is officially available for night operations, but the government permits such operations in emergencies.

Heliports
8 (2012)

References

Further reading

External links